Lady Grace Cavendish is a fictional detective and the central character in the "Lady Grace Mysteries", a series of historical novels for younger readers aimed at 8- to 14-year-olds. The author of the series is "Grace Cavendish", a pseudonym for three female authors: Patricia Finney, Sara Vogler and Jan Burchett.

Character
Lady Grace is a thirteen-year-old Maid of Honour to Queen Elizabeth I of England.  Lady Grace is Her Majesty's Lady Pursuivant, and whenever a mystery arises, Queen Elizabeth relies on Grace to solve it. The novels following Grace's adventures purport to be sections of her diary or "daybooke".  In her adventures, Grace is assisted by her friends Ellie and Masou. Grace's father had died in a jousting accident. So the palace staff are her only family.

Books featuring Grace Cavendish 
 Assassin by Patricia Finney, Doubleday, 2004, 
 Betrayal by Patricia Finney, Doubleday, 2004, 
 Conspiracy by Patricia Finney, 2005
 Deception by Sara Vogler & Jan Burchett, 2005
 Exile by Sara Vogler & Jan Burchett, 2006
 Feud by Patricia Finney, 2006
 Gold! by Sara Vogler & Jan Burchett, 2006
 Haunted by Sara Vogler & Jan Burchett, 2006
 Intrigue by Sara Vogler & Jan Burchett, 2008
 Jinx by Sara Vogler & Jan Burchett, 2008
 Keys by Sara Vogler & Jan Burchett, 2009
 Loot by Sara Vogler & Jan Burchett, 2010

Fictional gentleman detectives
Characters in children's literature
Fictional lords and ladies